Eccedoxa lysimopa is a moth in the family Lecithoceridae. It was described by Edward Meyrick in 1933. It is found in southern India.

References

Moths described in 1933
Torodorinae